was a  after Genji and before Meiji. The period spanned the years from May 1865 to October 1868.

Change of era
 May 1, 1865 (Genji 2/Keiō 1, 7th day of the 4th month) : The new era name of Keiō (meaning "Jubilant Answer") was created to mark the Kinmon Incident.  The previous era ended and a new one commenced in Genji 2.

Events of the Keiō era
 1866 (Keiō 2): Goryōkaku completed
 August 29, 1866 (Keiō 2, 20th day of the 7th month): Shōgun Iemochi died at Osaka; and the bakufu petitioned that Hitotsubashi Yoshinobu should be appointed as his successor.
 January 10, 1867 (Keiō 2, 5th day of the 12th month): Yoshinobu was appointed shōgun.
 January 30, 1867 (Keiō 2, 25th day of  the 12th month): Emperor Komei died.
 February 13, 1867 (Keiō 3, 9th day of the 1st month): Mutsuhito ascended to the throne as Emperor Meiji.
 November 10, 1867 (Keiō 3, 15th day of the 10th month): An Imperial edict was issued sanctioning the restoration of Imperial government.
  January 6, 1868 (Keiō 3, 10th day of the 12th month): The restoration of the Imperial government was announced to the kuge.  The year 1868 began as Keio 3, and did not become Meiji 1 until the 8th day of the 9th month of Keio 4, i.e., October 23; although retrospectively, it was quoted as the first year of the new era from 25 January onwards.
 January 27, 1868 (Keiō 4,  3rd of the 1st month): The Boshin War begins with the Battle of Toba–Fushimi.
 September 3, 1868 (Keiō 4, 17th day of the 7th month): Edo was renamed "Tokyo", i.e. meaning "Eastern Capital".
 October 8, 1868 (Keiō 4, 23rd of the 8th month): Battle of Aizu begins.
 October 12, 1868 (Keiō 4, 27th day of the 8th month): Emperor Meiji is crowned in the Shishin-den in Kyoto.
 October 23, 1868 (Keiō 4/Meiji 1, 8th day of the 9th month): The nengō is formally changed from Keiō to Meiji; and a general amnesty is granted. The adoption of the Meiji nengō was done retroactively to January 25, 1868 (Keiō 4/Meiji 1, 1st day of the 1st month).

Keio University
Keio University, which was initially established in 1858 (Ansei 5), seven years before the beginning of the Keiō era, is named after this era. This is the oldest existing institution of higher learning in Japan.

See also
 Keiō Reforms

Notes

References
 Ozaki, Yukio. (2001). The Autobiography of Ozaki Yukio: The Struggle for Constitutional Government in Japan. [Translated by Fujiko Hara]. Princeton: Princeton University Press. ;  OCLC 45363447
 Nussbaum, Louis Frédéric and Käthe Roth. (2005). Japan Encyclopedia. Cambridge: Harvard University Press. ; OCLC 48943301
 Ponsonby-Fane, Richard A. B. (1956). Kyoto: The Old Capital of Japan, 794-1869. Kyoto: The Ponsonby Memorial Society.  OCLC 559477127

External links
 National Diet Library, "The Japanese Calendar" ...historical overview plus illustrative images from library's collection
 National Archives of Japan ...Scroll image showing precise reproduction of Imperial standard and colors, Boshin War (1868)
 Toyohara Chikanobu, Mirror of the Ages (Jidai Kagami):  Keiō no koro.

Japanese eras
1860s in Japan
1865 introductions
1860s establishments in Japan
1860s disestablishments in Japan